The Prix Mystère de la critique was established in 1972 by , published by  from 1948 to 1976, and is one of the oldest French awards for a detective novel. It continues to be awarded each year by its founder, Georges Rieben and his team, and has the characteristic of having survived the demise of the magazine.

The prize is divided into two categories: French novel and foreign novel.

Laureates of the best French novel 
The prizewinners in the National category is reserved for the best French-language crime series published the previous year. The most successful in this category were the French Alain Demouzon (1979 and 2001), Pascal Dessaint (1997 and 2008), Thierry Jonquet (1994 and 1999), Dominique Manotti (2002 and 2007), Jean-Hugues Oppel (1995 and 2006), Fred Vargas (1996 and 2000) and Hervé Le Corre (2005 and 2010), who won the prize twice. Vargas was at the same time the first female criminal writer to be awarded the prize.
 2018: Franz Bartelt : L'hôtel du grand cerf, Coll. Cadre Noir, Le Seuil, 2017
 2017: Cloé Mehdi : Rien ne se perd, Jigal, 2017
 2016: DOA : Pukhtu, Série Noire/Gallimard, 2015
 2015: Nicolas Mathieu : Aux animaux la guerre, Actes Sud, 
 2014: Romain Slocombe : Première Station avant l'abattoir, Le Seuil (Seuil Policiers), 2013
 2013: Olivier Truc : Le Dernier Lapon, Métailié (Noire), 2012
 2012: Marcus Malte : Les Harmoniques, Éditions Gallimard (Série noire), 2011
 2011: Marin Ledun : La Guerre des vanités, Gallimard (Série noire), 2010
 2010: Hervé Le Corre : Les Cœurs déchiquetés, Rivages (Rivages/Thriller), 2009
 2009: Caryl Férey : Zulu, Gallimard (Série noire), 2008
 2008: Pascal Dessaint : Cruelles Natures, Rivages (Rivages/Thriller), 2007
 2007: Dominique Manotti : Lorraine Connection, Rivages (Rivages/Thriller), 2006
 2006: Jean-Hugues Oppel : French Tabloïds, Rivages (Rivages/Thriller), 2005
 2005: Hervé Le Corre : L’Homme aux lèvres de saphir, Rivages, 2004
 2004: Michèle Rozenfarb : L'Homme encerclé, Gallimard (Série noire), 2003
 2003: Claude Amoz : Bois-Brûlé, Rivages (Rivages/Noir), 2002
 2002: Dominique Manotti : Nos fantastiques années fric, Rivages (Rivages/Thriller), 2001
 2001: Alain Demouzon : La Promesse de Melchior, Calmann Levy (Melchior), 2000
 2000: Fred Vargas : L’Homme à l’envers, Viviane Hamy (Chemins nocturnes), 1999
 1999: Thierry Jonquet : Moloch, Gallimard (Série noire), 1998
 1998: Hugues Pagan : Dernière station avant l'autoroute, Rivages (Rivages/Thriller), 1997
 1997: Pascal Dessaint : Bouche d’ombre, Rivages (Rivages/Noir), 1996
 1996: Fred Vargas : Debout les morts, Viviane Hamy (Chemins nocturnes), 1995
 1995: Jean-Hugues Oppel : Brocéliande-sur-Marne, Rivages (Rivages/Noir), 1994
 1994: Thierry Jonquet : Les Orpailleurs, Gallimard (Série noire), 1993
 1993: Jean-Bernard Pouy : La Belle de Fontenay, Gallimard (Série noire), 1992
 1992: Tonino Benacquista : La Commedia des ratés, Gallimard (Série noire), 1991
 1991: Jacques Syreigeol : Une mort dans le Djebel, Gallimard (Série noire), 1990
 1990: Joseph Bialot : Un violon pour Mozart, Gallimard (Série noire), 1989
 1989: Patrick Raynal : Fenêtre sur femmes, Albin Michel, 1988
 1988: Daniel Pennac : La Fée carabine, Gallimard (Série noire), 1987
 1987: Didier Daeninckx : Play-Back, L’instant (L'Instant Noir), 1986
 1986: Jean Amila : , Gallimard (Série noire), 1985
 1985: Pierre Magnan : La Maison assassinée, Denoël, 1984
 1984: Tito Topin : 55 de fièvre, Gallimard (Série noire), 1983
 1983: Albert Davidson : Élémentaire mon cher Holmes, Denoël (Sueurs froides), 1982
 1982: Brice Pelman : Attention les fauves, Fleuve Noir (Spécial Police), 1981
 1981: Jean-François Coatmeur : La Bavure, Denoël (Sueurs froides), 1980
 1980: Jean Vautrin : Bloody Mary, Mazarine (Romans), 1979
 1979: Alain Demouzon : Mes crimes imparfaits, Flammarion, 1978
 1978: Michel Grisolia : L’Inspecteur de la mer, Jean-Claude Lattès
 1977: Georges-Jean Arnaud : Enfantasme, Fleuve Noir (Spécial Police), 1976 et A. D. G. : L’Otage est sans pitié, Gallimard (Super noire), 1976  (ex æquo)
 1976: Louis C. Thomas : La Place du mort, Denoël (Sueurs froides), 1975
 1975: Raf Vallet : Adieu Poulet, Gallimard (Super noire), 1974
 1974: Boileau-Narcejac : , Librairie des Champs-Elysées, 1973
 1973: Fred Kassak : Nocturne pour un assassin, Presses de la Cité (Suspens), 1972
 1972: Albert Simonin : Hotu soit qui mal y pense, Gallimard (Série noire), 1971

Laureates of the best foreign novel 
The prizewinners in the International category, is reserved for the best foreign crime scene published in the previous year in French translation. The most successful in this category were Donald E. Westlake (1972 and 2001), Robin Cook (1984 and 1995), William Bayer (1986 and 2005) and James Lee Burke (1992 and 2009), who could have won the award twice. Horst Bosetzky was the only German-speaking criminal writer, to succeed in the victory of a criminal writer. In 1988, he triumphed with his novel "Kein Reihenhaus" for Robin Hood, which had been published under the pseudonym -ky, under the title Robin des bois est mort, in the Bordeaux publishing house Le Mascaret the previous year.

2010s
2018 — Killarney Blues by Colin O'Sullivan (2013)
2017 — Cartel by Don Winslow (2015)
2016 — Hell on Church Street by Jake Hinkson (2011)
2015 — Black Flies  by Shannon Burke (2008)
2014 — The Singer's Gun by Emily St. John Mandel (2010)
2013 — The Devil All the Time by Donald Ray Pollock (2011)
2012 — The Twelve by Stuart Neville (2009)
2011 — Twilight by William Gay (2007)
2010 — The Resurrectionist by Jack O’Connell (2008)

2000s
2009 —  Last Car to Elysian Fields by James Lee Burke (2003)
2008 —  Winter's Bone by Daniel Woodrell (2006)
2007 —  Cinco mujeres y media by Francisco González Ledesma (2005)
2006 —  Jar City (Mýrin) by Arnaldur Indriðason (2000)
2005 —  The Dream of the Broken Horses by William Bayer (2002)
2004 —  Dead at Daybreak (Orion) by Deon Meyer (2000)
2003 —  Mystic River by Dennis Lehane (2001)
2002 —  The Winter Queen (Азазель) by Boris Akunin : Azazel (1998)
2001 —  The Hook by Donald E. Westlake (2000)
2000 —  Sidetracked (Villospår) by Henning Mankell (1995)

1990s
1999 — The Shape of Water (La forma dell’acqua) by Andrea Camilleri (1994)
1998 — The Poet by Michael Connelly (1996)
1997 — Enigma by Robert Harris (1995)
1996 — The Alienist by Caleb Carr (USA, 1994)
1995 — Not Till the Red Fog Rises by Robin Cook (1994)
1994 — March Violets by Philip Kerr (1989)
1993 — La Dama de Cachemira by Francisco González Ledesma (1986)
1992 — Black Cherry Blues by James Lee Burke (1989)
1991 — The Silence of the Lambs by Thomas Harris (1988)
1990 — The Big Nowhere by James Ellroy (1988)

1980s
1989 — The Wrong Case by James Crumley (USA, 1975)
1988 — Kein Reihenhaus für Robin Hood by Horst Bosetzky (Germany, 1979)
1987 — Coda by Tom Topor (USA, 1984)
1986 — Switch by William Bayer (USA, 1984)
1985 — Night of the Juggler by William P. McGivern (USA, 1975)
1984 — He Died With His Eyes Open by Robin Cook (UK, 1984)
1983 — Eddie Macon's Run by James McLendon (USA, 1980)
1982 — The Bourne Identity by Robert Ludlum (USA, 1980)
1981 — The Protector Malcolm Braly (USA, 1979)
1980 — Bad Ronald by Jack Vance (USA, 1973)

1970s
1979 — Passage of Arms by Eric Ambler (UK, 1959)
1978 — No award
1977 — No award
1976 — The File on Lester by Andrew Garve  (UK, 1974) 
1975 — No award
1974 — No award
1973 — No award
1972 — The Hot Rock by Donald E. Westlake (USA, 1970)

See also 
 List of crime writers

References

External links 
 Georges RIEBEN : un entretien avec le créateur du Prix Mystère de la Critique.
 Prix Mystère de la Critique on K-Libre
 Le Prix Mystère de la critique on Polars.org
 Prix Mystère de la Critique du Meilleur Roman étranger on Polars pourpre

French literary awards
Mystery and detective fiction awards
Awards established in 1972
1972 establishments in France